The 2009 FIBA Asia Championship for Men was the biennial Asian continental championship and also served as the FIBA Asia qualifying tournament for the 2010 FIBA World Championship. The tournament was held from August 6 to 16, 2009 in Tianjin, China.

Iran managed to win its second straight FIBA Asia Championship by defeating China 70–52 in the final, although China's premier NBA superstar Yao Ming did not play due to an injury in the 2008-09 NBA season, which caused him to not play in that year's FIBA Asia Championship for China. Jordan defeated Lebanon 80–66 in the bronze medal game to claim the third and final automatic bid for the 2010 FIBA World Championship. Both Iran and Jordan qualified for the FIBA World Championship for the first time while China qualified for the eighth time in the last nine World Championship tournaments, this time without center Yao Ming. Lebanon failed to qualify automatically for a third consecutive world championship, although FIBA later awarded them a wild card to the tournament.

Iranian center Hamed Haddadi was named Most Valuable Player for the second consecutive tournament after leading Iran to its second consecutive title by averaging 15.8 points, 13.1 rebounds, and 4 blocks per game during the tournament.

Qualification

According to the FIBA Asia rules, each zone had two places, and the hosts (China) and Stanković Cup champion (Jordan) were automatically qualified. The other four places are allocated to the zones according to performance in the 2008 FIBA Asia Stanković Cup.

* , which finished fourth behind Korea, Japan and China in the East Asian qualifiers, was given a wild card entry into the championship following the withdrawal of Gulf representatives Bahrain.

Qualifying was done via the 2008 FIBA Asia Stanković Cup where the champion automatically qualified, and from different FIBA Asia sub-zones. As hosts, China automatically qualified to the championship. In West and Middle Asia, no actual qualifying tournament was done as only a few teams on those sub-zones registered to participate in a qualifying tournament.

With the withdrawal of Bahrain, FIBA Asia chose Chinese Taipei as the final participant to the 16-team field.

This is the first championship where Hong Kong would not participate; they were consistent participant since the inaugural tournament in Manila.  Only Hong Kong and Syria did not return from the FIBA Asia Championship 2007.  They were replaced by Uzbekistan, returning to the tournament after a four-year absence, and Sri Lanka, making its first appearance since 1995.

This is also the third time in the 21st century in which the championships were held in the People's Republic of China; Shanghai was the host for 2001, and Harbin was the host in 2003.

Draw
The draw was held on June 17 at Tianjin.

Squads

Each team has a roster of twelve players. Only one naturalized player per team is allowed by FIBA.

Preliminary round

Group A

Group B

Group C

Group D

Second round
 The results and the points of the matches between the same teams that were already played during the preliminary round shall be taken into account for the second round.

Group E

Group F

Classification 13th–16th

Semifinals

15th place

13th place

Classification 9th–12th

Semifinals

11th place

9th place

Final round

Quarterfinals

Semifinals 5th–8th

Semifinals

7th place

5th place

3rd place

Final

Final standing

Iran, China and Jordan qualify to the 2010 FIBA World Championship outright.
Lebanon was later invited as a wild card to the 2010 FIBA World Championship.

Awards

Statistical leaders

Points

Rebounds

Assists

Steals

Blocks

References

External links
Official Website

 
2009
2009–10 in Asian basketball
2009–10 in Chinese basketball
International basketball competitions hosted by China
August 2009 sports events in Asia